In abstract algebra, Regev's theorem, proved by ,  states that the tensor product of two PI algebras is a PI algebra.

References

Theorems in ring theory